Navy Blues is a 1929 American Pre-Code romance film starring William Haines as a sailor and Anita Page as the girl he romances and leaves. This was Haines' first talking picture.

Cast
William Haines as Jack Kelly
Anita Page as Alice Brown
 Karl Dane as Sven Swanson
 J.C. Nugent as Mr. Reginald Brown
 Edythe Chapman as Mrs. Brown
 Wade Boteler as Chief Petty Officer Higgins

External links 
 
 

1929 films
American black-and-white films
1920s romantic comedy-drama films
Metro-Goldwyn-Mayer films
American romantic comedy-drama films
1920s American films
1920s English-language films